USL may refer to:

Arts and entertainment
 Underground Sound of Lisbon, a Portuguese dance music project
 Urban Strawberry Lunch, a band from Liverpool

Companies
 United Spirits Limited, India
 Former United States Lines shipping company

Computing
 Universal Systems Language
 Former US Unix System Laboratories

Education
 University of Louisiana at Lafayette, formerly University of Southwestern Louisiana, US
 University of Saint Louis Tuguegarao, Philippines

Sports
 Ultimate Soccer League
 United Soccer League (disambiguation)
 Former US United Soccer League (1984–85)
 United Soccer League
 USL Championship, a North American soccer league
 USL League One,  a North American soccer league
 USL League Two, a North American soccer league
 United States League, a baseball league
 Uttarakhand Super League, an association football league in India

Languages
 Ukrainian Sign Language

Other uses
 Social Liberal Union, a political alliance in Romania
 Upper Specification Limit, statistical measure used in a Process Window Index bounded by UCL/LCL and USL/LSL

See also
 United States League (disambiguation)